Mariusz Wiesław Trepka (born 6 January 1967 in Myszków) – is a Polish politician, local official and manager.

Biography 
He graduated from the Częstochowa University of Technology (2011, Management Department). In 2002, 2006, 2010 and 2014 was elected to the Myszków County Council. He was a member of the executive board of the council and from the year 2013, the vice-starosta of the Myszków County. In 2005, he joined the Law and Justice. In 2015, he took part in the parliamentary election from the third place of the PiS list in district 28, gaining 6025 votes and not winning a mandate.

He was appointed in January 2016 as the second vice-voivode of Silesia. In July 2018 he was elected to the Sejm, replacing Konrad Głębocki in the parliament. In the elections in 2019, he was again a candidate to the Sejm from the Częstochowa district. Trepka was elected, receiving 12,881 votes.

References 

1967 births
Living people
People from Silesian Voivodeship
Members of the Polish Sejm 2015–2019
Members of the Polish Sejm 2019–2023